Chalmers University of Technology (often shortened to Chalmers) is a Swedish university located in Gothenburg that conducts research and education in technology and natural sciences. The university has approximately 3100 employees and 10,000 students, and offers education in engineering, science, shipping, architecture and other management areas.

Chalmers is a highly-reputed university in education 
and research worldwide. It is considered a leading European technical university, and it is consistently ranked among the top 100 engineering universities in the world.

Chalmers is coordinating the Graphene Flagship, the European Union's biggest research initiative to bring graphene innovation out of the lab and into commercial applications, and leading the development of a Swedish quantum computer.

History

The university was founded in 1829 following a donation by William Chalmers, a director of the Swedish East India Company. He donated part of his fortune for the establishment of an "industrial school". The university was run as a private institution until 1937 when it became the second state-owned technical university. In 1994 the government of Sweden reorganised Chalmers into a private company (aktiebolag) owned by a government-controlled foundation.
Chalmers is one of only three universities in Sweden which are named after a person, the other two being Karolinska Institutet and Linnaeus University.

Departments
Chalmers University of Technology has the following 13 department:
 Architecture and Civil Engineering
 Biology and Biological Engineering
 Chemistry and Chemical Engineering
 Communication and Learning in Science
 Computer Science and Engineering
 Electrical Engineering
 Industrial and Materials Science
 Mathematical Sciences
 Mechanics and Maritime Sciences
 Microtechnology and Nanoscience
 Physics
 Space, Earth and Environment
 Technology Management and Economics

Furthermore, Chalmers is home to six Areas of Advance and six national competence centers in key fields such as materials, mathematical modelling, environmental science, and vehicle safety.

Research infrastructure 
Chalmers University of Technology's research infrastructure includes everything from advanced real or virtual labs to large databases, computer capacity for large-scale calculations and research facilities.
 Chalmers AI Research Centre, CHAIR
 Chalmers Centre for Computational Science and Engineering, C3SE
 Chalmers Mass Spectrometry Infrastructure, CMSI
 Chalmers Power Central
 Chalmers Materials Analysis Laboratory
 Chalmers Simulator Centre
 Chemical Imaging Infrastructure
 Facility for Computational Systems Biology
 HSB Living Lab
 Nanofabrication Laboratory
 Onsala Space Observatory
 Revere – Chalmers Resource for Vehicle Research
 The National laboratory in terahertz characterisation
 SAFER - Vehicle and Traffic Safety Centre at Chalmers

Rankings and reputation

Since 2012, Chalmers has achieved the highest reputation for Swedish Universities by the Kantar Sifo's Reputation Index. According to the survey, Chalmers is the most well-known university in Sweden regarded as a successful and competitive high-class institution with a large contribution to society and credibility in media.

In 2018, a benchmarking report from MIT ranked Chalmers top 10 in the world of engineering education. 
Additionally, based on the U-Multirank rankings, the European Commission recognized Chalmers as one of Europe's top universities in 2019, while in 2022, Chalmers characterized as a top performing university across various indicators (i.e., teaching & learning, research, knowledge transfer and international orientation) with the highest number of ‘A’ (very good) scores on the institutional level for Sweden.

Furthermore, in 2020, the World University Research Rankings placed Chalmers 12th in the world based on the evaluation of three key research aspects, namely research multi-disciplinarity, research impact, and research cooperativeness, while the QS World University Rankings, placed Chalmers 81st in the world in graduate employability.

Additionally, in 2021, the Academic Ranking of World Universities, placed Chalmers 51–75 in the world in the field of electrical & electronic engineering, the QS World University Rankings, placed Chalmers 79th in the world in the field of engineering & technology, the Times Higher Education World University Rankings, ranked Chalmers 68th in the world for engineering & technology  and the U.S. News & World Report Best Global University Ranking placed Chalmers 84th in the world for engineering.

In the 2011 International Professional Ranking of Higher Education Institutions, which is established on the basis of the number of alumni holding a post of Chief Executive Officer (CEO) or equivalent in one of the Fortune Global 500 companies, Chalmers ranked 38th in the world, ranking 1st in Sweden and 15th in Europe.

Ties and partnerships 
Chalmers is a member of the IDEA League network, a strategic alliance between five leading European universities of science and technology. The scope of the network is to provide the environment for students, researchers and staff to share knowledge, experience and resources.

Chalmers is also a member of the Nordic Five Tech network, a strategic alliance of the five leading technical universities in Denmark, Finland, Norway and Sweden. The Nordic Five Tech universities are amongst the top international technical universities with the goal of creating synergies within education, research and innovation.

Furthermore, Chalmers is a member of CESAER, an European association of universities of science and technology. Among others, the requirements for a university to be a member of CESAER is to provide excellent science and technology research, education and innovation as well as to have a leading position in their region, their country and beyond.

Moreover, Chalmers is a partner of the UNITECH International, an organization consisting of distinguished technical universities and multinational companies across Europe. UNITECH helps bridge the gap between the industrial and academic world offering exchange programs consisting of studies as well as an integrated internship at one of the corporate partners.

Additionally, Chalmers has established formal agreements with three leading materials science centers: University of California, Santa Barbara, ETH Zurich and Stanford University. Within the framework of the agreements, a yearly bilateral workshop is organized, and exchange of researchers is supported.

Chalmers has general exchange agreements with many European and U.S. universities and maintains a special exchange program agreement with National Chiao Tung University (NCTU) in Taiwan where the exchange students from the two universities maintain offices for, among other things, helping local students with applying and preparing for an exchange year as well as acting as representatives.

Furthermore, Chalmers has strong partnerships with major industries such as Ericsson, Volvo, Saab AB and AstraZeneca.

Students
Approximately 40% of Sweden's graduate engineers and architects are educated at Chalmers. Each year, around 250 postgraduate degrees are awarded as well as 850 graduate degrees. About 1,000 post-graduate students attend programmes at the university, and many students are taking Master of Science engineering programmes and the Master of Architecture programme. Since 2007, all master's programmes are taught in English for both national and international students. This was a result of the adaptation to the Bologna process that started in 2004 at Chalmers (as the first technical university in Sweden).

Currently, about 10% of all students at Chalmers come from countries outside Sweden to enrol in a master's or PhD program.

Around 2,700 students also attend Bachelor of Science engineering programmes, merchant marine and other undergraduate courses at Campus Lindholmen. Chalmers also shares some students with Gothenburg University in the joint IT University project. The IT University focuses exclusively on information technology and offers bachelor's and master's programmes with degrees issued from either Chalmers or Gothenburg University, depending on the programme.

Chalmers confers honorary doctoral degrees to people outside the university who have shown great merit in their research or in society.

Organization 
Chalmers is an aktiebolag with 100 shares à 1,000 SEK, all of which are owned by the Chalmers University of Technology Foundation, a private foundation, which appoints the university board and the president. The foundation has its members appointed by the Swedish government (4 to 8 seats), the departments appoint one member, the student union appoints one member and the president automatically gains one chair. Each department is led by a department head, usually a member of the faculty of that department. The faculty senate represents members of the faculty when decisions are taken.

Campuses

In 1937, the school moved from the city centre to the new Gibraltar Campus, named after the mansion which owned the grounds, where it is now located. The Lindholmen College Campus was created in the early 1990s and is located on the island Hisingen. Campus Johanneberg and Campus Lindholmen, as they are now called, are connected by bus lines.

Student societies and traditions
Traditions include the graduation ceremony and the Cortège procession, an annual public event.

 Chalmers Students' Union
 Chalmers Aerospace Club – founded in 1981. In Swedish frequently also referred to as Chalmers rymdgrupp (roughly Chalmers Space Group). Members of CAC led the ESA funded CACTEX (Chalmers Aerospace Club Thermal EXperiment) project where the thermal conductivity of alcohol at zero gravity was investigated using a sounding rocket.
 Chalmers Alternative Sports – Student association organizing trips and other activities working to promote alternative sports. Every year the Chalmers Wake arranges a pond wakeboard contest in the fountain outside the architecture building at Chalmers.
 Chalmersbaletten
 Chalmers Ballong Corps
 Chalmers Baroque Ensemble
 Chalmers Business Society (CBS)
 CETAC
 Chalmers Choir
ETA - (E-sektionens Teletekniska Avdelning) Founded in 1935, it's a student-run amateur radio society that also engages in hobby electronics.
 Chalmers Film and Photography Committee (CFFC)
 Chalmersspexet – Amateur theater group which has produced new plays since 1948
 Chalmers International Reception Committee (CIRC)
 XP – Committee that is responsible for the experimental workshop, a workshop open for students
 Chalmers Program Committee – PU
 Chalmers Students for Sustainability (CSS) – promoting sustainable development among the students and runs projects, campaigns and lectures
 Föreningen Chalmers Skeppsbyggare, Chalmers Naval Architecture Students' Society (FCS)
 Chalmers Sailing Society
 RANG – Chalmers Indian Association
 Caster – Developing and operating a Driver in the Loop (DIL) simulator, which is used in various courses and projects

Notable alumni
 Christopher Ahlberg, computer scientist and entrepreneur, Spotfire and Recorded Future founder
 Rune Andersson, Swedish Industrialist, owner of Mellby Gård AB and billionaire
 Abbas Anvari, former chancellor of Sharif University of Technology
 Linn Berggren, artist and former member of Ace of Base
 Gustaf Dalén, Nobel Prize in Physics
 Sigfrid Edström, director ASEA, president IOC
 Claes-Göran Granqvist, physicist
 Margit Hall, first female architect in Sweden
 Harald Hammarström, linguist
 Krister Holmberg, professor of Surface Chemistry at Chalmers University of Technology.
 Mats Hillert, metallurgist
 Ivar Jacobson, computer scientist
 Erik Johansson, photographic surrealist
 Jan Johansson, jazz musician
 Leif Johansson, former CEO Volvo
 Olav Kallenberg, probability theorist
 Marianne Kärrholm, chemical engineer and Chalmers professor
 Hjalmar Kumlien, architect
 Abraham Langlet, chemist
 Martin Lorentzon, Spotify and TradeDoubler founder
 Ingemar Lundström, physicist, chairman of the Nobel Committee for Physics
 Carl Magnusson, industrial designer and inventor
 Semir Mahjoub, businessman and entrepreneur
 Peter Nordin, computer scientist and entrepreneur
 Åke Öberg, biomedical scientist
 Leif Östling, CEO Scania AB
 PewDiePie (Felix Arvid Ulf Kjellberg), YouTuber (no degree)
 Carl Abraham Pihl, engineer and director of first Norwegian railroad (Hovedbanen)
 Richard Soderberg, businessman, inventor and professor at Massachusetts Institute of Technology
 Hans Stråberg, former President and CEO of Electrolux
 Ludvig Strigeus, computer scientist and entrepreneur
 Per Håkan Sundell, computer scientist and entrepreneur
 Jan Wäreby, businessman
 Gert Wingårdh, architect
 Vera Sandberg, engineer
 Anna von Hausswolff, musician
 Anita Schjøll Brede, entrepreneur

Presidents
Although the official Swedish title for the head is "rektor", the university now uses "President" as the English translation.

See also
 Chalmers School of Entrepreneurship
 IT University of Göteborg
 List of universities in Sweden
 Marie Rådbo, astronomer
 The International Science Festival in Gothenburg 
 University of Gothenburg (Göteborg University)

References

External links
 Chalmers University of Technology – official site
 Chalmers Student Union
 Chalmers Alumni Association

 
Educational institutions established in 1829
Technical universities and colleges in Sweden
Higher education in Gothenburg
Engineering universities and colleges in Sweden
1829 establishments in Sweden